The Xenia Community School District serves the general Xenia, Ohio area. There are five elementary schools, one middle school, one high school, and one preschool. The current superintendent is Dr Gabriel Lofton and the current President of the Board of Education is Josh Day.

Schools

Preschool
Xenia Preschool

Elementary schools
 Arrowood Elementary School
 Cox Elementary School
 McKinley Elementary School
 Shawnee Elementary School
 Tecumseh Elementary School

Middle school
 Warner Middle School

High school
 Xenia High School
 Xenia virtual academy

References

External links
 District Web Site

School districts in Ohio
Education in Greene County, Ohio
Xenia, Ohio